Parque Lefevre is a corregimiento within Panama City, in Panamá District, Panamá Province, Panama with a population of 36,997 as of 2010. Its population as of 1990 was 38,163; its population as of 2000 was 37,136.

References

Corregimientos of Panamá Province
Panamá District